The 2016–17 Gardner–Webb Runnin' Bulldogs men's basketball team represented Gardner–Webb University during the 2016–17 NCAA Division I men's basketball season. The Runnin' Bulldogs, led by fourth-year head coach Tim Craft, played their home games at the Paul Porter Arena in Boiling Springs, North Carolina as members of the Big South Conference. They finished the regular season 18–13, 11–7 in Big South play to finish in fourth place. They received the No. 4 seed in the Big South tournament where they defeated High Point in the quarterfinals before losing in the semifinals to Winthrop.

Previous season
The Runnin' Bulldogs finished the 2015–16 season 17–16, 10–8 in Big South play to finish in a tie for fifth place. They defeated Campbell and Coastal Carolina to advance to the semifinals of the Big South tournament where they lost to Winthrop.

Roster

Schedule and results

|-
!colspan=9 style=| Non-conference regular season

|-
!colspan=9 style=| Big South regular season

|-
!colspan=9 style=| Big South tournament

References

Gardner–Webb Runnin' Bulldogs men's basketball seasons
Gardner-Webb
Gardner-Webb Runnin' Bulldogs men's basketball
Gardner-Webb Runnin' Bulldogs men's basketball